The National Union Building is a historic building, located at 918 F Street, Northwest, Washington, D.C., in the Penn Quarter neighborhood. It is currently owned by Douglas Development Corporation, and leased as an event and entertainment space

History
It was designed by Glenn Brown in 1890, and is an example of Romanesque architecture. 
The fire proof steel frame brownstone was built for the National Union Fire Insurance Company.

It was listed on the National Register of Historic Places in 1990, and is a contributing property to the Downtown Historic District.

It served as LivingSocial's "experience" building from 2013 - 2014.

Notes

External links

http://wikimapia.org/13714052/National-Union-Building
http://www.loc.gov/pictures/item/DC0309/#

Commercial buildings on the National Register of Historic Places in Washington, D.C.
Commercial buildings completed in 1890
Romanesque Revival architecture in Washington, D.C.